Peter Crampton (10 June 1932 – 12 July 2011) was a British Labour Party politician who was the Member of the European Parliament (MEP) from 1989 to 1999 representing the Humberside constituency. He was also the father of Times journalist Robert Crampton.

Biography

He was born in Blackpool in 1932 and educated at Blackpool Grammar School and Nottingham University.  He was a teacher and lecturer of geography. He married a geography teacher from London in 1955.  They had two sons, born in 1962 and 1964. After a spell in Solihull, in 1970 the family moved to Hull so he could take up a post at Hull College of Higher Education (now merged into the University of Lincoln). In Hull he was active in Labour politics.

He retired from teaching in 1988 and was briefly a parliamentary researcher for MP Joan Ruddock.  He was MEP for the Humberside constituency from 1989 until he stood down at the 1999 election.

In 1995 he was one of 32 MEPs who placed an advertisement in The Guardian opposing the plans of then Labour leader Tony Blair to re-write Clause 4 of the Labour constitution.

He played an active part the Stop the War Coalition. He was also involved in a campaign against the Trident nuclear deterrent.

Personal life

He lived in Hull with his wife. He had two sons, David Crampton (born 1962), and Robert Crampton (born 1964). His brother, E. P. T. Crampton, is an author on religious subjects.

References

External links 

 Peter Crampton obituary by Alan Franks, The Guardian, 27 September 2011

1932 births
2011 deaths
People educated at Blackpool Grammar School
Alumni of the University of Nottingham
British anti-war activists
Labour Party (UK) MEPs
MEPs for England 1989–1994
MEPs for England 1994–1999